Calathea anulque is a species of plant in the Marantaceae family that is endemic to Ecuador.  Its natural habitat is subtropical or tropical moist montane forests.

References

Endemic flora of Ecuador
anulque
Endangered plants
Taxonomy articles created by Polbot